Didlington Park Lakes is a  biological Site of Special Scientific Interest south of Didlington in Norfolk.

These three artificial lakes probably date to the early nineteenth century. They are an important breeding site for wildfowl, including gadwall, teal, mallard, shoveler, tufted duck and great crested grebe.

The site is private land with no public access.

References

Sites of Special Scientific Interest in Norfolk